Daniel Vernet (21 May 1945 – 15 February 2018) was a French journalist. He was the editor-in-chief of Le Monde, France's centre-left newspaper of record, from 1989 to 1991, and the author of several bools.

Early life

Daniel Vernet was born circa 1945 in Chamalières, Puy-de-Dôme, France.

Career
Vernet began his career as a journalist for La Montagne. He joined Le Monde, where he was the foreign correspondent in Bonn, West Germany from 1973 to 1977), in Moscow, Soviet Union from 1977 to 1981, and in London, U.K. from 1981 to 1983. He was the editor-in-chief of Le Monde from 1985 to 1991, and he retired in 2009. He later wrote for Slate.

Vernet was the author of several books about the Soviet Union, Germany, the Yugoslav Wars and the neoconservative influence on U.S. foreign policy.

Personal life and death
Vernet had a wife, Marie-Thérèse, and a daughter. He died of a heart attack on 15 February 2018.

Works

References

1945 births
2018 deaths
People from Chamalières
French male journalists
20th-century French journalists
21st-century French journalists
French newspaper editors